Ekor lotong, ekor lutong, or ekor lutung refers to a kind of traditional Malay blackpowder weapon. It is also known as monkey tail cannon.

The ekor lotong is a kind of relatively small swivel cannon. Typically, ekor lotongs are made of iron. The name "ekor lotong" means "tail of a lotong" refers to the handle on the back of the cannon used to aim the cannon. The handle is usually curved (resembling a monkey tail), and is also made of iron.

See also 

 Rentaka
 Cetbang

References

External links 

 Pameran senjata tradisional papar rahsia, keagungan seni survival diri., Berita Harian Online, Jumaat, 02 Januari 2009, Shamshul Azree Samshir.

Naval artillery
Early firearms
Indonesian inventions
Weapons of Indonesia
Weapons of Java
Indonesian culture
Malaysian culture
Cannon